Neptis aurivillii is a butterfly in the family Nymphalidae. It is found in Kenya, Tanzania, Malawi and Zambia. The habitat consists of montane and sub-montane forests.

The larvae feed on Macaranga species and Urera hypselodendron.

Subspecies
Neptis aurivillii aurivillii (south-eastern Kenya, Tanzania, Malawi, Zambia)
Neptis aurivillii ufipa Kielland, 1990 (Tanzania: west to the Ufipa district)

References

Butterflies described in 1913
aurivillii